Arlen Ingolf Erdahl  (born February 27, 1931) is an American commercial farmer and former politician. He served as a member of the Minnesota House of Representatives from 1963 to 1970, Minnesota Secretary of State from 1971–1975 and was a U.S. Representative from Minnesota, serving the first district from 1979–1983, in the 96th and 97th congresses.

He had Presidential appointments to serve as Country Director and later Associate Director for the Peace Corps from 1983 to 1989 and as Principal Deputy/Acting Assistant Secretary for International Affairs at the U.S. Department of Energy from 1989 to 1993. He has served on the boards of the United Nations Association of Minnesota, Nobel Peace Prize Forum, Minnesota chapter of People to People, Minneapolis Lodge of the Sons of Norway and Growth & Justice. In 1999 he received the Twin Cities International Citizen Award and in 2011 was recognized for his public leadership and service with the Hubert H. Humphrey Public Leadership Award by the Humphrey School of Public Affairs at the University of Minnesota.

Background 
Arlen Ingolf Erdahl was born in Blue Earth, Faribault County, Minnesota to a Norwegian-born mother and a father of Norwegian descent. He attended Faribault County public schools. He graduated from St. Olaf College (B.A. 1953) and Harvard University  (M.P.A., 1966). He  served in United States Army from 1954–1956. He was a grain/livestock farmer.

Political career
Erdahl served in the Minnesota House of Representatives from 1963 to 1970 and was a Republican. He then served as Minnesota Secretary of State from 1971 to 1975. From 1975 to 1978, Erdahl served on the Minnesota Public Service Commission. Then he served in the United States House of Representatives from 1979 to 1983. His cousin was Dale Erdahl who also served in the Minnesota Legislature.

His successful 1978 Congressional campaign was managed by Arlen Wittrock.  For Erdahl's four years as a member of the U.S. House of Representatives, Keith Hall served as his Washington Chief of Staff and Arlen Wittrock served as his Minnesota Chief of Staff.

Later career and legacy 
In April, 2011 he was recognized for his public leadership and service with the Hubert H. Humphrey Public Leadership Award by the Humphrey School of Public Affairs at the University of Minnesota.

The Arlen Inglof Erdahl collection at the Southern Minnesota Historical Center, Memorial Library at the Minnesota State University, Mankato contains materials about his seven years in the Minnesota House of Representatives and his campaign for Minnesota Secretary of State in 1970.

References

External links 

 
 Arlen  Erdahl photograph

1931 births
American people of Norwegian descent
Farmers from Minnesota
Harvard Kennedy School alumni
Living people
Republican Party members of the Minnesota House of Representatives
Military personnel from Minnesota
Peace Corps people
People from Blue Earth, Minnesota
People from Burnsville, Minnesota
Secretaries of State of Minnesota
St. Olaf College alumni
United States Army soldiers
United States Department of Energy officials
Republican Party members of the United States House of Representatives from Minnesota
Members of Congress who became lobbyists